The Ron Kennedy Trophy is awarded to the "player judged most valuable to his team" in the Austrian Hockey League (EBEL). The trophy has been known as the Ron Kennedy Trophy since the 2009–10 Austrian Hockey League season. The trophy is named after Ron Kennedy, who died at 9 July 2009 from cancer. Kennedy played in the Austrian League in the 80's, and was head coach of the Austrian National Team and several teams in the Austrian League.

List of winners

References

Austria
Awards established in 2009
Most valuable player awards